Robert L. Roderer (born 1926) is an American retired politician who was a member of the Ohio House of Representatives.

References

1926 births
Possibly living people
Democratic Party members of the Ohio House of Representatives